Teuane Ann Tibbo (2 October 1895 - 24 May 1984) was a Samoan-born New Zealand artist. She started painting when she was 71 years old; her work is held in the permanent collections of Auckland Art Gallery Toi o Tāmaki, Museum of New Zealand Te Papa Tongarewa, The University of Auckland and the National Gallery of Australia.

Tibbo was born in Pago Pago, grew up in Samoa, and later lived in Fiji as an adult before moving to Auckland, New Zealand in 1945 with her husband and eight children. She began painting in the 1960s, without any formal training, when one of her daughters became interested in art. Pat Hanly introduced Tibbo to Barry Lett, who became her dealer and showed her work at Barry Lett Galleries; her first solo exhibition was at Lett's gallery in 1964. Her work often depicted leisure activities from her Samoan childhood, such as fishing, cricket, swimming, church and picnics.

In 2002 a retrospective of her work, "Keep It in the Heart: The Paintings of Teuane Tibbo" was held in Auckland at the Lopdell House Gallery (now Te Uru). Her work was also featured in the 2021 exhibition Stars Start Falling, which was presented at the Govett-Brewster Art Gallery and Te Uru.

In 2009 Tibbo's daughter Audie Pennefather published a biography of Tibbo's life, A true & strange story : the life of Teuane Ann Tibbo, artist 1895 -1984.

References

1895 births
1984 deaths
Samoan emigrants to New Zealand
20th-century New Zealand painters
20th-century New Zealand women artists
New Zealand women painters
Samoan expatriates in Fiji